SPAD may refer to:

In aircraft manufacture
 Société Pour L'Aviation et ses Dérivés, also Société Provisoire des Aéroplanes Deperdussin and Blériot-SPAD, French aircraft manufacturer (1912–1921)
 SPAD VII, SPAD S.XII and SPAD S.XIII, French fighter planes of World War I produced by Société Pour L'Aviation et ses Dérivés
 A-1 Skyraider, nicknamed Spad, an attack aircraft (1950s and 1960s)
 Simple Plastic Airplane Design, a type of radio-controlled model airplane

In science
 Single Pass Albumin Dialysis, liver dialysis
 Single-photon avalanche diode, a photodetector

Other uses
 Special adviser (UK), a government post
 Self-propelled air defence, weapons
 Signal passed at danger by a train
 Suruhanjaya Pengangkutan Awam Darat, the Land Public Transport Commission of Malaysia

See also
 Spade (disambiguation)